David Nunn may refer to:

David Alexander Nunn (1833–1918), U.S. Representative from Tennessee
David Nunn (actor) (1962–2012), British actor

See also
David Nunn Fisher (1816–1887), English actor and musician usually known as David Fisher